The Horseshoe Lake Mound and Village Site is a pre-Columbian archaeological site located on the northeast shore of Horseshoe Lake in Madison County, Illinois. The site includes a platform temple mound and a village site with the remains of multiple houses. The site was inhabited by Mississippian peoples during the Late Woodland period from roughly 600-1050 A.D. The village at the site was part of the settlement system connected to Cahokia; it was a third line community, a class of community distinguished by a single temple mound, in the system. Of the five known third line communities in the Cahokia system, the Horseshoe Lake Site is the only one which is relatively intact. The site also includes substantial plant and animal remains, which indicate that its settlers produced maize.

The site was added to the National Register of Historic Places on November 26, 1980.

References

Archaeological sites on the National Register of Historic Places in Illinois
National Register of Historic Places in Madison County, Illinois
Mississippian culture
Mounds in Illinois